John Chaine was an Irish Anglican priest.

Chaine was born in County Antrim and educated at Trinity College, Dublin. He was  Dean of Connor from his collation in 1839  until his resignation in 1855.

References 

Deans of Connor
Alumni of Trinity College Dublin
People from County Antrim
19th-century Irish Anglican priests